Karakiya District is a district of Mangystau Region in south-western Kazakhstan. The administrative center of the district is the selo of Kuryk. Population:

References

Districts of Kazakhstan
Mangystau Region